Live & Rare is an album by punk band Reagan Youth. It was released after the break-up of the band in 1989 and the suicide of lead singer Dave Rubinstein in 1993.

Track listing
"It's a Beautiful Day" – 3:53
"Degenerated" – 2:18
"Go Nowhere" – 1:22
"(Down with The) New Aryans" – 1:17
"No Class" – 1:34
"Urban Savages" – 1:23
"Brave New World" – 4:30
"Acid Rain" – 1:55
"Anytown" – 2:00
"(Are You) Happy?" – 1:33
"USA" – 1:22
"I Hate Hate" – 1:58
"In Dog We Trust" – 2:50
"Reagan Youth" – 1:15
"USA" – 1:22
"I Hate Hate" – 1:58
"Degenerated" – 2:18
"Postlude" – 1:01

Reagan Youth albums
1998 compilation albums
1998 live albums